"Glory" is a song by American rapper Common (Lonnie Lynn, as awarded) and American singer John Legend. It was written by John Legend, Common, and Rhymefest. The song was released on December 11, 2014, by Columbia Records as the theme song from the 2014 film Selma, which portrays the 1965 Selma to Montgomery marches. Common also co-starred in the film as Civil Rights Movement leader James Bevel.

Commercially, the song peaked at number 49 on the US Billboard Hot 100. A music video for the song was directed by Paramount Pictures and was released on January 12, 2015. The song won the award for Best Original Song at the 87th Academy Awards (2015) and the 72nd Golden Globe Awards (2015), as well as the award for Best Song Written for Visual Media at the 58th Annual Grammy Awards (2016).

Awards

Music video

The music video was directed by Paramount Pictures. It was put on Common's official Vevo account on January 12, 2015. The video stars Legend and Common. The video, which includes footage from the film, begins with Legend playing the piano and then singing, with Common rapping in a different location.

Live performances
"Glory" was performed by Legend and Common on the American morning television show Good Morning America on January 5, 2015.

On February 8, 2015, the duo performed the song as culmination to the 57th Annual Grammy Awards ceremonies held at the Staples Center in Los Angeles, California.

Legend and Common performed "Glory" during the 87th Academy Awards show on February 22, 2015 using a stage-setting of Selma's Edmund Pettus Bridge. The song won the Oscar for Best Original Song.

In October 2015, Common surprised a student choir in Compton, California with a live performance of "Glory" in support of My Brother's Keeper Challenge. The promotion was run by Omaze, a private internet company that raises funds for charity through online auctions and merchandise sales.

A year later on October 26, 2016, Common performed the song with Yolanda Adams at the White House on the South Lawn for BET Presents: Love and Happiness: An Obama Celebration.

It was performed by Legend and Common, backed by a choir, at the 2020 Democratic National Convention. They also played it during a Joe Biden rally at Pennsylvania, a day before the 2020 United States presidential election.

Commercial performance
"Glory" debuted on the Billboard Hot 100 at number 92. It became Common's fourth charted song of his own, and peaked at number 49.

Charts

Release history

See also
 Civil rights movement in popular culture

References

External links
 
 

2014 singles
2014 songs
John Legend songs
Common (rapper) songs
Songs written by John Legend
Songs written by Common (rapper)
Grammy Award for Best Song Written for Visual Media
Columbia Records singles
Def Jam Recordings singles
GOOD Music singles
Best Original Song Academy Award-winning songs
Best Original Song Golden Globe winning songs
Soul ballads
2010s ballads
Songs written by Rhymefest
Songs against racism and xenophobia